Sevens Ale House (known colloquially as The Sevens) is a public house in the heart of the  Beacon Hill neighborhood of Boston, Massachusetts. Located at 77 Charles Street, it has been in operation since .

The pub has a distinctive silver beer stein on its overhead sign on the building's front. The establishment is also notable for being one of the few remaining with a dart board.

Bartender John Martin has worked at the pub since the mid-1990s. Around that time, in 1994, the pub won the "Best Neighborhood Bar" award from Best of Boston. "Sunday through Friday, it's a locals bar. Saturdays are for the tourists," Martin said in 2021.

Harpoon Brewery brews a "Sevens Ale" specifically for the pub. Sevens Ale House was one of the brewery's first two accounts upon its foundation in 1986.

On June 2, 2017, Harrison Ford visited the pub, which is part of the Beacon Hill Business Association.

Due to the COVID-19 pandemic, the business was closed for the 15-month period between March 2020 and June 2021.

References

Buildings and structures in Boston
Restaurants in Boston
Restaurants established in 1933
1933 establishments in Massachusetts
Beacon Hill, Boston